Secusses was the name of a tribe belonging to the Venetic peoples that are sometimes confused with Illyrians.

References 

Adriatic Veneti
Ancient peoples of Europe